The Brooks Hotel, located off the East Side Highway in Corvallis, Montana, is a historic hotel built in 1894.  It was listed on the National Register of Historic Places in 1980.

It was built in Queen Anne-style as the residence of George Dougherty, a merchant in Corvallis.  It is 
"composed of numerous catalogue-ordered sections" and is described in its NRHP nomination "as an intriguing architectural landmark in the Bitterroot Valley".

References

National Register of Historic Places in Ravalli County, Montana
Queen Anne architecture in Montana
Hotel buildings completed in 1894
1894 establishments in Montana